To Mary – with Love is a 1936 American drama film directed by John Cromwell, written by Richard Sherman and Howard Ellis Smith, and starring Warner Baxter, Myrna Loy, Ian Hunter, Claire Trevor, Jean Dixon and Pat Somerset. The film was released on August 1, 1936, by 20th Century Fox.

Plot
A husband and wife look back over the joys, sorrows, mistakes, merriment, tragedies, and triumphs of a ten year marriage that started in the roaring twenties.

Cast

Warner Baxter as Jack Wallace
Myrna Loy as Mary Wallace
Ian Hunter as Bill Hallam
Claire Trevor as Kitty Brant
Jean Dixon as Irene
Pat Somerset as Sloan Potter
Helen Brown as Switchboard Nurse
Wedgwood Nowell as Doctor
Harold Foshay as Doctor
Paul Hurst as Drunk
Franklin Pangborn as Guest
Tyler Brooke as Guest
Arthur Aylesworth as Bartender
Florence Lake as Salesgirl
Edward Cooper as Butler
Margaret Fielding as Nurse
Ruth Clifford as Nurse
Louise Lorimer as Nurse
Jean Houghton as Nurse
Margaret Brayton as Nurse
Edwin Maxwell as Byron C. Wakefield
Grace Goodall as Customer
Beth Hazelton as Cashier
Eddie Dunn as Politician
Tom McGuire as Politician
Tom Ricketts as Waiter
Tammany Young as Thug
Niles Welch as Secretary
Richard Powell as Customs Officer
Frank O'Connor as Conductor
Virginia Paxton as Guest at Wedding
William Cromwell as Interne
Eric Wilton as Footman
Jay Eaton as Guest
Phyllis Barry as Guest
Evelyn Barlow as Guest
Geneva Sawyer as Guest
Paul McVey as Guest
Richard Barbee as Guest
Howard Hickman as Guest
Frances Paxton as Girl
Carlyle Blackwell Jr. as Boy
Daisy Bufford as Maid
Matt McHugh as Taxi Driver
Irving Bacon as Chauffeur
Mario Dominici as Hotel Manager
Jean De Briac as Clerk
Larry Wheat as Minor Role 
James Cane as Minor Role

References

External links 
 

1936 films
American drama films
1936 drama films
20th Century Fox films
Films directed by John Cromwell
American black-and-white films
1930s English-language films
1930s American films